III EP may refer to:

 III EP (Family Force 5 EP)
 III EP (Tinchy Stryder EP)

See also
 III the EP, by Mondo Generator, 2004